"Seventies" is a song by Japanese dance unit, MAX. It is a Japanese cover of Eurobeat artist Mega NRG Man's song of the same name. It was composed by Groove Surfers with Japanese lyrics written by Kazumi Suzuki. It was released as their fourth single and the original version of the song appears on the albums, Maximum (1996), Maximum Collection (1999) and Precious Collection 1995–2002 (2002). It was used in commercials for Japanese brand donuts Mister Donut. It was also the group's first top ten single debuting and peaking at #7.

Track list 

1996 singles
MAX (band) songs
1996 songs
Avex Trax singles